Mehkuyeh-ye Sofla (also Romanized as Mehkūyeh-ye Soflá; also known as Mehkūyeh-ye Pāeen) is a village in Khvajehei Rural District, Meymand District, Firuzabad County, Fars Province, Iran. At the 2006 census, its population was 315, in 74 families.

References 

Populated places in Firuzabad County